Televizija Dalmacija is a Croatian commercial television station in Split. It airs programs from their offices situated at Poljud stadium. TV Dalmacija transferred Formula 1.

External links

Official Televizija Dalmacija Home Page

Television channels in Croatia
Mass media in Split, Croatia
Television channels and stations established in 2001
2001 establishments in Croatia